Affirmation or affirm may refer to:

Logic
 Affirmation, a declaration that something is true
 In logic, the union of the subject and predicate of a proposition

Law
 Affirmation (law), a declaration made by and allowed to those who conscientiously object to taking an oath
 Affirmed in law, means that a decision has been reviewed and found valid

Business
 Affirm (company), a financial technology company

Psychology
 Self-affirmation, the psychological process of re-affirming personal values to protect self-identity
 Affirmations (New Age), the practice of positive thinking in New Age terminology
 Affirmative prayer, a form of prayer that focuses on a positive outcome
 Nietzschean affirmation, a philosophical concept according to which we create meaning and knowledge for ourselves in a nihilistic world

Organisations
 Affirmation: Gay & Lesbian Mormons, an international Mormon organisation
 Affirmation Scotland, an LGBT group within the Church of Scotland
 Affirmations (Ferndale, Michigan), an LGBT community center in Ferndale, Michigan

Music
 Affirmation (Beverley Knight album), and song by Knight on this album
 Affirmation (Savage Garden album)
 "Affirmation" (George Benson song), a song written by José Féliciano, which became a jazz standard associated with George Benson
 "Affirmation" (Savage Garden song)

Other uses
 Affirmation and negation in grammar
 Affirmation of St. Louis, the founding document of the Continuing Anglican Movement churches
 Affirmations (film), a 1990 short film
 The Affirmation, a 1981 novel by Christopher Priest
 Affirmations (L. Ron Hubbard), a work written by L. Ron Hubbard

See also
 Affirmative (disambiguation)
 Negation (disambiguation)